The 2019–20 East Super League (known as the McBookie.com East Superleague for sponsorship reasons) was the 18th season of the East Superleague, the top tier of league competition for SJFA East Region member clubs.

The league was split into North and South regional divisions, both containing 10 teams playing each other three times for a total of 27 games. The winners of each division were due to play each other in a two-legged play-off to determine the overall champion. The season began on 3 August 2019 and was scheduled to end on 25 April 2020. Lochee United were the reigning champions. 

As a result of the COVID-19 pandemic, the league was indefinitely suspended on 13 March 2020. The season was officially cancelled on 10 April 2020 following a decision made by the East Region Management Committee, due to the uncertainty surrounding the pandemic and the Scottish Football Association's decision to extend the football shutdown until at least 10 June 2020.

On 16 April 2020 the East Region Management Committee declared the 2019–20 season null and void.

Teams
The following teams changed division after the 2018–19 season.

To East Superleague
Promoted from East Premier League North
 Dundee North End
 Luncarty
 Scone Thistle

Promoted from East Premier League South
 Armadale Thistle
 Bathgate Thistle
 Harthill Royal
 Livingston United
 Lochore Welfare
 Pumpherston

From East Superleague
Transferred to East of Scotland League
 Glenrothes

North

Stadia and locations

League table

Results

Double round-robin

Single round-robin

South

Stadia and locations

League table

Results

Double round-robin

Single round-robin

Championship play-off
A two legged play-off was scheduled to take place at the end of the season to determine the overall East Region champions.

References

External links

6
East Superleague seasons
East Superleague